Changsha University of Science and Technology ( CSUST;  ; Chinese abbr. 长沙理工) is located in Changsha, Hunan province, China. The university is a provincial key university of Hunan.

As of 2022, the Best Chinese Universities Ranking, also known as the "Shanghai Ranking", placed the university 5th in Hunan.

History

With a history of 57 years, Changsha University of Science and Technology (CSUST) evolves into an engineering-centered multidisciplinary university, integrating engineering, science, management, economics, liberal arts and law, with a stronghold in undergraduate education and a capacity of post-doctoral science and research workstations, conference of Doctor's Degree and recommendation of postgraduates for Master's Degree. It has been granted with "National Excellent Grassroots Party Organization" and "Hunan Provincial Model Unit of Civility".

Ever since the founding of the university, it has nurtured nearly 200,000 graduates, serving mainly in transportation, power industry, hydrological industry and light industry, making their contributions to regional and social economic development.

Description

The university has 16 teaching schools (departments), 1 independent college and 1 continuous education college and enrolls students from 31 provinces (municipalities and autonomous regions) in China. It now has a registered full-time undergraduates of over 30,000 PhD and Master's degree candidates of around 4,700. It sets up 30 undergraduate majors, 2 post-doctoral workstations, 3 disciplines and 15 sub-disciplines for doctoral degrees, 20 disciplines and 105 sub-disciplines for master’s degrees, 7 professional degree authorizations. It is accredited to confer master’s degrees to those with equivalent academic attainments. The university has 27 natural sciences innovation platforms, such as national engineering laboratories, science and technology innovation teams, key laboratories at provincial or ministerial level and engineering research centers; 10 provincial philosophy and social sciences innovation platforms, 11 key disciplines at provincial or ministerial level, 17 undergraduate teaching projects, such as national talents cultivation innovative pilot, teaching contingents, experiment (practice) teaching centers, disciplines with characteristics, elaborate courses and bilingual education demonstration courses.

The university is located on Jinpenling and Yuntang Campuses, with an area of 210.56 hectares and a total floor space of 1,170,000 square meters. The university has fixed assets totaling 2.4 billion yuan, among which the apparatus and equipment for teaching and research are valued at 300 million yuan. The university has a collection of more than 2,960,000 books, 3192 kinds of domestic and international periodicals and 4285GB EBooks. A gigabit backbone networking system and part of the network core systems have been set up. Multimedia classrooms and language laboratories can seat 16,642 students. The playground covers an area of 213,700 square meters, including an indoor space of 34,500 square meters.

Rankings and reputation 

As of 2022, the Best Chinese Universities Ranking, also known as the "Shanghai Ranking", placed the university 5th in Hunan. As of 2021, Changsha University of Science and Technology was ranked 701-800 globally by the Academic Ranking of World Universities (ARWU), and ranked 740th by SCImago Institutions Rankings among research universities around the world. As of 2022, Changsha University of Science and Technology ranked 36th in China, 69th in Asia and 372nd globally by the U.S. News & World Report Best Global University Ranking.

International
The university has established exchange and cooperation with 66 institutions of higher learning and research institutions from over 40 countries and regions, including the United States of America, the United Kingdom, France, Russia, Canada, South Korea, Liberia and Hong Kong.

References

 
Universities and colleges in Hunan
Universities and colleges in Changsha
Technical universities and colleges in China
Educational institutions established in 1956
1956 establishments in China